Asociación Deportiva Mérida, S.A.D. is a Spanish football club based in Mérida, in the autonomous community of Extremadura. Founded in 2013 it is a successor club of CP Mérida, it currently plays in Primera División RFEF – Group 1.

History
The club was founded on 19 February 2013 and six days later, it was registered in General Registry of Sports Entities of Extremadura. Mérida UD was dissolved later in 2013 and Mérida AD bought their place in Tercera División.

On 30 May 2015, the club was promoted to Segunda División B after defeating CD Laredo 2–1 on aggregate in the playoffs. On 27 August that year, the team competed in the Copa del Rey for the first time, losing 0–3 at home to Peña Sport FC in the opening round.

In 2017–18, the club were given a bye to the second round of the cup, where they lost 2–0 at CF Fuenlabrada. The season ended with relegation back to the fourth tier after a 2–2 aggregate defeat (away goals) to Coruxo FC in the relegation play-offs, but the club bounced back a year later with a penalty shootout win against UD Socuéllamos.

After a league restructuring in 2021, Mérida was placed in the new fourth-tier Segunda División RFEF. That season, they came runners-up in their group to Córdoba CF and achieved promotion via the play-offs with a 2–0 extra-time win over CD Teruel.

Season to season

1 season in Primera División RFEF
5 seasons in Segunda División B
1 season in Segunda División RFEF
3 seasons in Tercera División

Current squad
.

Reserve team

Stadium
Mérida plays its home games at Estadio Romano, with a capacity of 14,600 spectators.

Google map for Estadio Romano

Managerial history
 Ángel Alcazar (2015)
 Antonio Gómez (2016)
 José Miguel Campos (2016)
 Bernardo Plaza (2016)
 Eloy Jiménez (2016–17)
 Mehdi Nafti (2017) 
 Loren Morón (2017–18)
 Mehdi Nafti (2018)
 Santi Amaro (2019)
 Diego Merino (2019–20)
 Juanma (2020)
 Dani Mori (2020–21)
 Miguel Rivera (2021)
 Juan García (2021)
 Javier Álvarez de los Mozos (2021–22)
 Juanma (2022–)

References

External links
Official website 
Official twitter 
Futbolme team profile 
Official blog 
FEF profile 

Football clubs in Extremadura
Mérida, Spain
Association football clubs established in 2013
2013 establishments in Extremadura
Phoenix clubs (association football)
Primera Federación clubs